Springbok is the largest town in the Namaqualand area in the Northern Cape province of South Africa. It was called Springbokfontein until 1911, when it was shortened to Springbok. Springbok is located on the N7 national route which connects the Cape with Namibia, and at the western end of the N14, which connects it with Upington and Pretoria. It is the main town of the Nama Khoi Local Municipality, which also includes a number of surrounding towns such as Okiep and Nababeep.

This name gives away the reason for the early settlement which gradually turned into a major commercial and administrative centre for copper mining operations in the region. While the town initially developed rapidly, this slowed when rich copper deposits were discovered in Okiep. As the main source of water, Springbok continued to develop as the commercial and administrative centre for different mines in the area. Even though mining activities have dwindled, the town remains an important administrative capital in the region and due to its location a favourite stopover for tourists on their way to Namibia. Today the main income is generated from tourism, mining activities, commerce and farming.

As of 2011, the small town which covers an area of 37.56 km², had a population of 12790. Coloured people make up 79.9% of its residents with Afrikaans being the most widely spoken language.

Flora
Springbok experiences low levels of air humidity, limited soil moisture and severe sunshine throughout the year. This often arid area is home to seasonal vegetation and drought resistant succulents like the kokerboom which have adapted to the harsh conditions to survive.

What would generally be an unfavourable environment for vegetation, this area experiences high floral diversity. Springbok is especially fascinating since almost half of the plant species here are found nowhere else in the world.

When the winter rain falls, the Goegap Nature Reserve, home to the Hester Malan Wild Flower Garden, with outcrops of granite, is covered in spring flowers like irises and orchids.

The streets lead off from a central little koppie (hill) which now shows off Namaqualand’s strange flora, such as the almost leafless Quiver tree whose branches were used by San people to hold their arrows. This area is famed for the incredible transformation which occurs every spring, when the near-lifeless scrubland explodes into colour from thousands of flowers hidden in the dry dusty earth, brought to life by winter rains.

History
The town was founded on the farm Melkboschkuil when the farm was purchased from Kowie Cloete for £750 (£573,000 or ZAR6,705,520 in 2010) in 1852 so as to establish a copper mine.  In 1862 the town of Springbokfontein was laid out. The -fontein (fountain) was dropped in later years.

The "Klipkoppie" was used during the Second Boer War as a fort by the Boers under General Manie Maritz as it provided  an excellent vantage point across the valley.  Remains of stone walls inside the koppie can still be seen today.  Next to the "Klipkoppie" is the beautiful Klipkerk (Stone Church) which was built in 1921.

Tourism
The town’s mining history, flora and connection to the Second Boer War makes it a rich hub of natural and cultural heritage. It is still widely used as a stopover for those traveling between South Africa and Namibia.

Monument Koppie, a small hill situated in the centre of town, remains a historical site and landmark. While most of this area was destroyed by dynamite, planted by a commando, led by General Jan Smuts, some of the remains still stand today.

Copper was first discovered in the area by the Governor of the Cape, Simon van der Stel, in 1685. Blue Mine is believed to mark the origins of commercial mining in South Africa. The area has a blue tinge created when copper reacts with oxygen in the air.

The Goegap Nature Reserve, south-east of the main town, is a conservation area that gets covered in spring flowers. It also the home of several mammalian species like springbok, gemsbok and aardwolf. Throughout the year tourists visit for hikes and mountain biking on the trails and routes across the tranquil land.

Gallery

References

External links

Photographs of Flora in Springbok

Populated places in the Nama Khoi Local Municipality
Namaqualand
Populated places established in 1862
Mining communities in South Africa
1862 establishments in the Cape Colony